is a hot spring resort located in Gunma Prefecture, Japan, northwest of Tokyo. It is a popular tourist destination.

There are 13 public baths at Kusatsu Onsen. The small bathhouses that are free for both town residents and tourists are managed by the townspeople themselves.

The source of its hot water is nearby Mount Kusatsu-Shirane and the appearance of the waters range from cloudy to clear, because the sources of the water that the baths rely upon are different.

The springs were known as a resort for centuries, but they became well known after the water was recommended for its health benefits by Erwin von Baelz, a German doctor who taught medicine at Tokyo University.

The locals claim the hot springs can cure all forms of ailments. Guests have claimed that pain disappears while soaking in its hot water.

Gallery

Ground transportation

Buses
Kusatsu Onsen Bus Terminal
Jōshū Yumeguri - 上州ゆめぐり号 from Shinjuku Station or Tokyo Station via Ikaho Onsen
Kusatsu Line - 草津線 from Naganohara-Kusatsuguchi Station

Railway
None

See also
List of hot springs in Japan
List of hot springs in the world

References

External links 

 Onsen Ism Kusatsu
 Kusatsu Onsen (Kusatsu Hot Spring) Travel Guide

Hot springs of Japan
Buildings and structures in Gunma Prefecture
Landforms of Gunma Prefecture
Tourist attractions in Gunma Prefecture